Vishnupur Bathua Halt railway station is a halt railway station on Samastipur–Muzaffarpur line under the Sonpur railway division of the East Central Railway zone. The railway station is situated beside Tajpur―Pusa Road at Vishnupur Bathua in Samastipur district of the Indian state of Bihar.

References

Railway stations in Samastipur district
Sonpur railway division